In the United States, the ACH Network is the national automated clearing house (ACH) for electronic funds transfers established in the 1960s and 1970s. It processes financial transactions for consumers, businesses, and federal, state, and local governments. ACH processes large volumes of credit and debit transactions in batches. Short for "Automated Clearing House", ACH credit transfers include direct deposit for payroll, Social Security and other benefit payments, tax refunds, and vendor payments. ACH direct debit transfers include consumer payments on insurance premiums, mortgage loans, and other kinds of bills.

The rules and regulations that govern the ACH network are established by National Automated Clearinghouse Association (Nacha). In 2018, the network processed 23billion transactions with a total value of $51.2trillion. Credit card payments are handled by separate networks.

The Reserve Banks and the Electronic Payments Network (EPN) are the ACH operators.

History
The ideas leading to the ACH arose in the late 1960s. One early predecessor was a US federal initiative used to help United States Air Force personnel get their paychecks on time. The success of this initiative led to an expansion to other employees and the government adopted it as a major payroll standard.

Separately in 1968 a group of check clearinghouse associations set up The Special Committee on Paperless Entries (SCOPE) to build an automated payment system after concerns for the number of checks being cleared for payrolls.

This led to the first ACH association, formed in California in 1972. Other regional ACH associations followed. The difficulty in compliance between different organizations led them to join to form National Automated Clearinghouse Association (Nacha) in 1974.

Nacha consolidated and added new rules which led to ACH. As computer and telecommunication technology advanced over the next few years, the system continued to develop. By 1978, electronic funds transfers were available.

From the late 1980s through to the 2000s, the system continued to develop with a number of enhancements. In 2001, there was a major reorganization of Nacha which led to financial institutions insured by the Federal Deposit Insurance Corporation becoming direct members making it much easier for the ACH network to be used by banks; that same year internet payments also went into effect which would go on to be a big part of ACH payments.

Uses of the ACH payment system
 Bank treasury management departments sell this service to business and government customers
 Business-to-business payments
 Direct debit payment of consumer bills such as mortgages, loans, utilities, insurance premiums, rents, and any other regular payment
 Direct deposit of payroll, Social Security and other government payments, and tax refunds
 E-commerce payments
 Federal, state, and local tax payments
 Non-immediate transfer of funds between accounts at different financial institutions (when a real-time transfer is required, a wire transfer using a system such as the Federal Reserve's Fedwire is employed instead)

Types of ACH transactions
For each ACH payment from a payor's bank account to a payee's bank account, there are effectively two ACH transactions created and transmitted, namely an ACH Debit transaction and an ACH Credit transaction. In the case of a payor and payee having an account at the same financial institution, there is only one ACH transaction, which is often called an "on-us" transaction.

ACH Debit transaction
The payee's sending institution creates, batches, and transmits an ACH Debit transaction to the payor's receiving institution. The ACH Debit transaction instructs the receiving institution to withdraw and transmit the funds from the payor's bank account to the sending institution.
 
The receiving institution must send the return to the sending institution by the end of the following business day if it is unable to debit the funds from the payor's account, such if the account was not found, the account was closed, or the account was frozen.
 
For an ACH Debit transaction, the sending institution may be a third-party bank, rather than the payee's bank.

ACH Credit transaction
The payor's sending institution creates, batches, and transmits an ACH credit to the payee's receiving institution. The ACH Credit transaction instructs the receiving institution to credit the funds to the payee's bank account.
 
The receiving institution must send the return to the sending institution by the end of the following business day if it is unable to credit the funds to the payee's account, such if the account was not found, the account was closed, or the account was frozen.

For an ACH Credit, the sending institution may not be a third-party bank, rather than the payor's bank.

Types of ACH settlements
There are two types of ACH settlements.

Next-day ACH
ACH debits and credits are transactions that are created, batched, and transmitted to an ACH operator, typically by way of a financial institution's connection to the ACH Network.

With next-day ACH, each ACH transaction is cleared overnight. The sending institution (called the Originating Depository Financial Institution) sends the transaction to the receiving institution (called the Receiving Depository Financial Institution). When the receiving institution receives the transaction, it has until the end of the next working day to send a rejection to the sending institution. If the sending institution does not receive a return from the receiving institution by the morning of the third business day, then the transaction is deemed to be successful.

Waiting for a timeout for two business days is an antiquated feature of ACH that lingers on from the 1960s when the ACH system was designed and implemented. It is not as quick as real-time payment networks. Consequently, ACH debit or credit transaction can take four working days to complete.

Same-day ACH 
With same-day ACH, settlement can happen the same day. The sending institution can transmit files to the receiving institution the same day, expediting the processing of ACH transactions. The receiving institution still has two business days in which to send a return, so there will still be a delay of two business days in same-day ACH debit transactions. On the other hand, ACH credit transactions can be credited on the same business day as along as the receiving institution receives the ACH transaction within the correct window.

Transactions exceeding $100,000 and international transactions are not eligible for same-day ACH.

Nacha instituted same-day ACH in four phases. As of September 15, 2017, banks were required to accept debit requests in the same three settlement windows. As of September 23, 2016, financial institutions were required to be able to process ACH credit requests to add funds to an account in all three settlement windows. As of March 16, 2018, banks were required to make funds available as fully settled completed transactions by 5:00p.m. local time for ACH credit transactions processed in the day's first two settlement windows.  As of March 20, 2020, the per-transaction limit was raised from $25,000 to $100,000.

SEC codes
Common Standard Entry Class (SEC) codes are as follows.

See also
 Clearing (finance)
 Clearing house (finance)
 Clearing House Association
 Directo a México
 Electronic funds transfer
National Automated Clearing House
 Originating Depository Financial Institution
 Pan-European automated clearing house
 Universal Payment Identification Code
 Wire transfer

References

External links
 Nacha, The Electronic Payments Association
 Federal Reserve Payment Systems

Banking in the United States
Banking technology
Banking terms
E-commerce in the United States
Federal Reserve System
Payment clearing systems
Payment networks